Windows 10 November 2019 Update (also known as version 1909 and codenamed "19H2") is the eighth major update to Windows 10 as the cumulative update to the May 2019 Update. It carries the build number 10.0.18363.

Version history
The first preview was released to Insiders who opted in to the slow ring on July 1, 2019. The update began rolling out on November 12, 2019. Notable changes in the November 2019 Update include:

Ability to create events from the Calendar fly-out on the taskbar
Improvements to notification management, including thumbnails demonstrating notification banners and the Action Center in application notification settings, and the ability to access per-application notification settings from their displays in Action Center
The Start menu's navigation sidebar icons expand into a drawer with text labels when the cursor is hovered over them
Support for using third-party digital assistants from the lock screen
OneDrive integration with File Explorer's search

The update reached end of service after the release of build 18363.2274 on May 10, 2022.

See also
Windows 10 version history

References

Windows 10
History of Microsoft
Software version histories